Renewi plc is a leading European waste management company operating primarily in the Benelux region. It is listed on the London Stock Exchange and Euronext Amsterdam.

History
The Company was founded by Guy Shanks and Andrew McEwan in 1880 as a construction company operating primarily in the West of Scotland under the name of Shanks & McEwan. In 1988 the Company acquired London Brick Landfill and with it an enormous landfill capacity north of London. The Company was first listed on the London Stock Exchange in 1988.

In the mid-1990s, the Company sold its remaining construction interests to concentrate solely on waste management. In 1998 the Company went on to buy four waste management companies in Belgium. It changed its name to Shanks Group in 1999.

In March 2000, the Company bought Waste Management Nederland B.V. in the Netherlands.

In July 2004, the Company sold its UK landfill and landfill gas power assets to Terra Firma.

In 2006, the Company went on to buy Smink Beheer B.V. in the Netherlands for €62m.

In September 2016, the company reached an agreement to buy the Dutch recycling firm Van Gansewinkel Groep BV for €432 million as part of a merger that, upon completion on 28 February 2017, created to newly rebranded Renewi plc.

In 2019, as part of a strategy to focus the business on its core operations and regions, the company sold its Canadian operations to Convent Capital  and its Reym-branded industrial cleaning business to Remondis.

Operations
The company's current operations are concentrated within the following three countries:

 UK: activities include long term local authority municipal solid waste (MSW) contracts, the anaerobic digestion of food waste, and the production of lower-carbon alternatives to fossil fuels.
 The Netherlands: activities include collections, sorting and processing, re-use and recycling, soil cleaning, composting, landfill, refuse-derived fuel production and industrial cleaning.
 Belgium: activities include collections, recycling, soil cleaning, refuse-derived fuel production, waste treatment and landfill in Flanders, Wallonia, and Brussels.

References

External links
 Official site

Service companies of the United Kingdom
Companies listed on the London Stock Exchange
Construction and civil engineering companies of the United Kingdom
Waste management companies of the United Kingdom
Companies based in Milton Keynes
British companies established in 1880
Private equity portfolio companies
1880 establishments in England
Construction and civil engineering companies established in 1880